3,4-Methylenedioxymethamphetamine (MDMA), commonly known as ecstasy (tablet form); and molly or mandy (crystal form), is a potent empathogen–entactogen with stimulant properties primarily used for recreational purposes. The desired effects include altered sensations, increased energy, empathy, and pleasure. When taken by mouth, effects begin in 30 to 45 minutes and last three to six hours.

MDMA was first developed in 1912 by Merck. It was used to enhance psychotherapy beginning in the 1970s and became popular as a street drug in the 1980s. MDMA is commonly associated with dance parties, raves, and electronic dance music. It may be mixed with other substances such as ephedrine, amphetamine, and methamphetamine. In 2016, about 21 million people between the ages of 15 and 64 used ecstasy (0.3% of the world population). This was broadly similar to the percentage of people who use cocaine or amphetamines, but lower than for cannabis or opioids. In the United States, as of 2017, about 7% of people have used MDMA at some point in their lives and 0.9% have used it in the last year.

Short-term adverse effects include grinding of the teeth, blurred vision, sweating and a rapid heartbeat, and extended use can also lead to addiction, memory problems, paranoia and difficulty sleeping. Deaths have been reported due to increased body temperature and dehydration. Following use, people often feel depressed and tired, although this effect does not appear in clinical use, suggesting that it is not a direct result of MDMA administration.  MDMA acts primarily by increasing the activity of the neurotransmitters serotonin, dopamine and noradrenaline in parts of the brain. It belongs to the substituted amphetamine classes of drugs.

MDMA is illegal in most countries and has limited approved 
medical uses in a small number of countries. In the United States, the Food and Drug Administration is currently evaluating the drug for clinical use. Canada has allowed limited distribution of MDMA and other psychedelics such as psilocybin upon application to and approval by Health Canada.

Effects
In general, MDMA users report feeling the onset of subjective effects within 30 to 60 minutes of oral consumption and reaching peak effect at 75 to 120 minutes, which then plateaus for about 3.5 hours. The desired short-term psychoactive effects of MDMA have been reported to include:
 Euphoria – a sense of general well-being and happiness
 Increased self-confidence, sociability, and perception of facilitated communication
 Entactogenic effects—increased empathy or feelings of closeness with others and oneself
 Dilated pupils
 Relaxation and reduced anxiety
 Increased emotionality
 A sense of inner peace
 Mild hallucination
 Enhanced sensation, perception, or sexuality
 Altered sense of time

The experience elicited by MDMA depends on the dose, setting, and user. The variability of the induced altered state is lower compared to other psychedelics. For example, MDMA used at parties is associated with high motor activity, reduced sense of identity, and poor awareness of surroundings. Use of MDMA individually or in small groups in a quiet environment and when concentrating, is associated with increased lucidity, concentration, sensitivity to aesthetic aspects of the environment, enhanced awareness of emotions, and improved capability of communication. In psychotherapeutic settings, MDMA effects have been characterized by infantile ideas, mood lability, and memories and moods connected with childhood experiences.

MDMA has been described as an "empathogenic" drug because of its empathy-producing effects. Results of several studies show the effects of increased empathy with others. When testing MDMA for medium and high doses, it showed increased hedonic and arousal continuum. The effect of MDMA increasing sociability is consistent, while its effects on empathy have been more mixed.

Use

Recreational

MDMA is often considered the drug of choice within the rave culture and is also used at clubs, festivals, and house parties. In the rave environment, the sensory effects of music and lighting are often highly synergistic with the drug. The psychedelic amphetamine quality of MDMA offers multiple appealing aspects to users in the rave setting. Some users enjoy the feeling of mass communion from the inhibition-reducing effects of the drug, while others use it as party fuel because of the drug's stimulatory effects. MDMA is used less often than other stimulants, typically less than once per week.

MDMA is sometimes taken in conjunction with other psychoactive drugs such as LSD, psilocybin mushrooms, 2C-B, and ketamine. The combination with LSD is called "candy-flipping".

Medical

, MDMA has no accepted medical indications. Before it was widely banned, it saw limited use in psychotherapy. In 2017 the United States Food and Drug Administration (FDA) approved limited research on MDMA-assisted psychotherapy for post-traumatic stress disorder (PTSD), with some preliminary evidence that MDMA may facilitate psychotherapy efficacy for PTSD.

Other
Small doses of MDMA are used by some religious practitioners as an entheogen to enhance prayer or meditation. MDMA has been used as an adjunct to New Age spiritual practices.

Forms
MDMA has become widely known as ecstasy (shortened "E", "X", or "XTC"), usually referring to its tablet form, although this term may also include the presence of possible adulterants or diluents. The UK term "mandy" and the US term "molly" colloquially refer to MDMA in a crystalline powder form that is thought to be free of adulterants. MDMA is also sold in the form of the hydrochloride salt, either as loose crystals or in gelcaps. MDMA tablets can sometimes be found in a shaped form that may depict characters from popular culture, likely for deceptive reasons. These are sometimes collectively referred to as "fun tablets".

Partly due to the global supply shortage of sassafras oil—a problem largely assuaged by use of improved or alternative modern methods of synthesis—the purity of substances sold as molly have been found to vary widely. Some of these substances contain methylone, ethylone, MDPV, mephedrone, or any other of the group of compounds commonly known as bath salts, in addition to, or in place of, MDMA. Powdered MDMA ranges from pure MDMA to crushed tablets with 30–40% purity. MDMA tablets typically have low purity due to bulking agents that are added to dilute the drug and increase profits (notably lactose) and binding agents. Tablets sold as ecstasy sometimes contain 3,4-methylenedioxyamphetamine (MDA), 3,4-methylenedioxyethylamphetamine (MDEA), other amphetamine derivatives, caffeine, opiates, or painkillers. Some tablets contain little or no MDMA. The proportion of seized ecstasy tablets with MDMA-like impurities has varied annually and by country. The average content of MDMA in a preparation is 70 to 120 mg with the purity having increased since the 1990s.

MDMA is usually consumed by mouth. It is also sometimes snorted.

Adverse effects

Short-term
Acute adverse effects are usually the result of high or multiple doses, although single dose toxicity can occur in susceptible individuals. The most serious short-term physical health risks of MDMA are hyperthermia and dehydration. Cases of life-threatening or fatal hyponatremia (excessively low sodium concentration in the blood) have developed in MDMA users attempting to prevent dehydration by consuming excessive amounts of water without replenishing electrolytes.

The immediate adverse effects of MDMA use can include:

 Bruxism (grinding and clenching of the teeth)
 Dehydration
 Diarrhea
 Erectile dysfunction
 Hyperthermia
 Increased wakefulness or insomnia
 Increased perspiration and sweating
 Increased heart rate and blood pressure
 Increased psychomotor activity
 Loss of appetite
 Nausea and vomiting
 Visual and auditory hallucinations (rarely)

Other adverse effects that may occur or persist for up to a week following cessation of moderate MDMA use include:

Physiological

 Insomnia
 Loss of appetite
 Tiredness or lethargy
 Trismus (lockjaw)

Psychological

 Anhedonia
 Anxiety or paranoia
 Depression
 Impulsiveness
 Irritability
 Memory impairment
 Restlessness

Administration of MDMA to mice causes DNA damage in their brain, especially when the mice are sleep deprived. Even at the very low doses that are comparable to those self-administered by humans, MDMA causes oxidative stress and both single and double-strand breaks in the DNA of the hippocampus region of the mouse brain.

Long-term

, the long-term effects of MDMA on human brain structure and function have not been fully determined. However, there is consistent evidence of structural and functional deficits in MDMA users with high lifetime exposure. There is no evidence of structural or functional changes in MDMA users with only a moderate (<50 doses used and <100 tablets consumed) lifetime exposure. Nonetheless, MDMA in moderate use may still be neurotoxic. Furthermore, it is not clear yet whether "typical" users of MDMA (1 to 2 pills of 75 to 125 mg MDMA or analogue every 1 to 4 weeks) will develop neurotoxic brain lesions. Long-term exposure to MDMA in humans has been shown to produce marked neurodegeneration in striatal, hippocampal, prefrontal, and occipital serotonergic axon terminals. Neurotoxic damage to serotonergic axon terminals has been shown to persist for more than two years. Elevations in brain temperature from MDMA use are positively correlated with MDMA-induced neurotoxicity.  However, most studies on MDMA and serotonergic neurotoxicity in humans focus on the heaviest users, those who consume more than seven times the average.  It is therefore possible that no serotonergic neurotoxicity is present in most casual users. Adverse neuroplastic changes to brain microvasculature and white matter also occur in humans using low doses of MDMA. Reduced gray matter density in certain brain structures has also been noted in human MDMA users. Global reductions in gray matter volume, thinning of the parietal and orbitofrontal cortices, and decreased hippocampal activity have been observed in long term users. The effects established so far for recreational use of ecstasy lie in the range of moderate to severe effects for serotonin transporter reduction.

Impairments in multiple aspects of cognition, including attention, learning, memory, visual processing, and sleep have been found in regular MDMA users. The magnitude of these impairments is correlated with lifetime MDMA usage and are partially reversible with abstinence. Several forms of memory are impaired by chronic ecstasy use; however, the effects for memory impairments in ecstasy users are generally small overall. MDMA use is also associated with increased impulsivity and depression.

Serotonin depletion following MDMA use can cause depression in subsequent days. In some cases, depressive symptoms persist for longer periods. Some studies indicate repeated recreational use of ecstasy is associated with depression and anxiety, even after quitting the drug. Depression is one of the main reasons for cessation of use.

At high doses, MDMA induces a neuroimmune response that, through several mechanisms, increases the permeability of the blood–brain barrier, thereby making the brain more susceptible to environmental toxins and pathogens. In addition, MDMA has immunosuppressive effects in the peripheral nervous system and pro-inflammatory effects in the central nervous system.

MDMA may increase the risk of cardiac valvulopathy in heavy or long-term users due to activation of serotonin 5-HT2B receptors.  MDMA also induces cardiac epigenetic changes in DNA methylation, particularly hypermethylation changes.

Harm assessment

A 2007 UK study ranked MDMA 18th in harmfulness out of 20 recreational drugs. Rankings for each drug were based on the risk for acute physical harm, the propensity for physical and psychological dependency on the drug, and the negative familial and societal impacts of the drug. The authors did not evaluate or rate the negative impact of ecstasy on the cognitive health of ecstasy users (e.g. impaired memory and concentration).

Reinforcement disorders

Approximately 60% of MDMA users experience withdrawal symptoms when they stop taking MDMA. Some of these symptoms include fatigue, loss of appetite, depression, and trouble concentrating. Tolerance to some of the desired and adverse effects of MDMA is expected to occur with consistent MDMA use. A 2007 analysis estimated MDMA to have a psychological dependence and physical dependence potential roughly three-fourths to four-fifths that of cannabis.

MDMA has been shown to induce ΔFosB in the nucleus accumbens. Because MDMA releases dopamine in the striatum, the mechanisms by which it induces ΔFosB in the nucleus accumbens are analogous to other dopaminergic psychostimulants.  Therefore, chronic use of MDMA at high doses can result in altered brain structure and drug addiction that occur as a consequence of ΔFosB overexpression in the nucleus accumbens. MDMA is less addictive than other stimulants such as methamphetamine and cocaine. Compared with amphetamine, MDMA and its metabolite MDA are less reinforcing.

One study found approximately 15% of chronic MDMA users met the DSM-IV diagnostic criteria for substance dependence. However, there is little evidence for a specific diagnosable MDMA dependence syndrome because MDMA is typically used relatively infrequently.

There are currently no medications to treat MDMA addiction.

During pregnancy
MDMA is a moderately teratogenic drug (i.e., it is toxic to the fetus). In utero exposure to MDMA is associated with a neuro- and cardiotoxicity and impaired motor functioning. Motor delays may be temporary during infancy or long-term. The severity of these developmental delays increases with heavier MDMA use.

Overdose
MDMA overdose symptoms vary widely due to the involvement of multiple organ systems. Some of the more overt overdose symptoms are listed in the table below. The number of instances of fatal MDMA intoxication is low relative to its usage rates. In most fatalities, MDMA was not the only drug involved. Acute toxicity is mainly caused by serotonin syndrome and sympathomimetic effects. Sympathomimetic side effects can be managed with carvedilol. MDMA's toxicity in overdose may be exacerbated by caffeine, with which it is frequently cut in order to increase volume. A scheme for management of acute MDMA toxicity has been published focusing on treatment of hyperthermia, hyponatraemia, serotonin syndrome, and multiple organ failure.

Interactions 

A number of drug interactions can occur between MDMA and other drugs, including serotonergic drugs. MDMA also interacts with drugs which inhibit CYP450 enzymes, like ritonavir (Norvir), particularly CYP2D6 inhibitors. Life-threatening reactions and death have occurred in people who took MDMA while on ritonavir. Concurrent use of MDMA high dosages with another serotonergic drug can result in a life-threatening condition called serotonin syndrome. Severe overdose resulting in death has also been reported in people who took MDMA in combination with certain monoamine oxidase inhibitors, such as phenelzine (Nardil), tranylcypromine (Parnate), or moclobemide (Aurorix, Manerix). Serotonin reuptake inhibitors such as citalopram (Celexa), duloxetine (Cymbalta), fluoxetine (Prozac), and paroxetine (Paxil) have been shown to block most of the subjective effects of MDMA. Norepinephrine reuptake inhibitors such as reboxetine (Edronax) have been found to reduce emotional excitation and feelings of stimulation with MDMA but don't appear to influence its entactogenic or mood-elevating effects.

Pharmacology

Monoamine transporters 
In humans, MDMA increases the amount of serotonin in the synaptic clefts of serotonergic neurons by inhibiting its uptake into neurons and by directly releasing it from the neurons. The released serotonin binds to various serotonin receptors and activates them in excess, which is the primary mechanism through which MDMA causes intoxication. MDMA also induces significant norepinephrine release.

Extracellular MDMA binds to presynaptic serotonin (SERT), norepinephrine (NET) and dopamine transporters (DAT) as a reuptake inhibitor, so that they uptake less of their namesake monoamine neurotransmitters. The efficacy of MDMA inhibition is highest towards NET and SERT, and is much less towards DAT. As a result, more norepinephrine and serotonin remains in the synaptic cleft.

These monoamine transporters (SERT, NET and DAT) reuptake their respective neurotransmitters via ion gradient. Normally there is a high extracellular sodium (Na+) and chloride (Cl–) ion concentration, and low potassium (K+) ion concentration in respect to intracellular concentrations. In each reuptake cycle, one monoamine, Na+ and Cl– are simultaneously taken inside the cell. One intracellular K+ is then transported outside the cell. In experimental situations, high extracellular K+ concentration can cause reverse transport. MDMA can substitute for K+ in this transport. Thus, high extracellular MDMA can reverse the transport. This reversal is most notable with SERT and NET, which results in direct serotonin and norepinephrine release in exchange for cellular uptake of MDMA.

VMAT2 and other effects 

Intracellular MDMA binds to VMAT2-proteins on synaptic vesicles as an inhibitor. Each VMAT2 transports cytosolic monoamines into the vesicle by dissipating proton gradient across the vesicular membrane. Thus, VMAT2 inhibition results in more free cytosolic monoamines like serotonin in the case of serotonergic neurons. These monoamines can then be released via monoamine transporters, which have been reversed by MDMA (see below).

Intracellular MDMA can also bind to monoamine oxidase A (MAO-A) as an inhibitor, and thus prevent it from breaking down cytosolic serotonin. However, this effect is not significant in humans.

Cortisol, prolactin, and oxytocin quantities in blood serum are increased by MDMA.

Receptor binding 
In humans, MDMA is an indirect agonist at the following receptors:
5-HT1A-, 5-HT2A-, 5-HT2B- ja 5-HT2C-serotonin receptors
α1-, α2A-, β-adrenergic receptors
D1- ja D2-dopamine receptors
M1- ja M2-muscarinic receptors
H1-histamine receptor

MDMA is a direct agonist at the following receptors:
TA1-receptor (TAAR1)
VMAT2-receptor 

MDMA has two enantiomers, S-MDMA and R-MDMA. Mixture of the two (racemate) is typically used recreationally. S-MDMA causes the entactogenic effects of the racemate, because it releases serotonin, norepinephrine and dopamine much more efficiently via monoamine transporters. It also has higher affinity towards 5-HT2CR. R-MDMA has notable agonism towards 5-HT2AR, which supposedly contributes to the mild psychedelic hallucinations induced by high doses of MDMA in humans. MDMA racemate is a partial agonist towards human TAAR1, but this is not physiologically relevant due to low EC50. Relevant EC50 would be below 5 µM, but for humans it is 35 µM. However, the agonism is significant towards the TAAR1 of mice and rats (EC50 is 1–4 µM).

Pharmacokinetics

The MDMA concentration in the blood stream starts to rise after about 30 minutes, and reaches its maximal concentration in the blood stream between 1.5 and 3 hours after ingestion. It is then slowly metabolized and excreted, with levels of MDMA and its metabolites decreasing to half their peak concentration over the next several hours. The duration of action of MDMA is usually four to six hours, after which serotonin levels in the brain are depleted. Serotonin levels typically return to normal within 24–48 hours.

Metabolites of MDMA that have been identified in humans include 3,4-methylenedioxyamphetamine (MDA), 4-hydroxy-3-methoxymethamphetamine (HMMA), 4-hydroxy-3-methoxyamphetamine (HMA), 3,4-dihydroxyamphetamine (DHA) (also called alpha-methyldopamine (α-Me-DA)), 3,4-methylenedioxyphenylacetone (MDP2P), and 3,4-Methylenedioxy-N-hydroxyamphetamine (MDOH). The contributions of these metabolites to the psychoactive and toxic effects of MDMA are an area of active research. 80% of MDMA is metabolised in the liver, and about 20% is excreted unchanged in the urine.

MDMA is known to be metabolized by two main metabolic pathways: (1) O-demethylenation followed by catechol-O-methyltransferase (COMT)-catalyzed methylation and/or glucuronide/sulfate conjugation; and (2) N-dealkylation, deamination, and oxidation to the corresponding benzoic acid derivatives conjugated with glycine. The metabolism may be primarily by cytochrome P450 (CYP450) enzymes CYP2D6 and CYP3A4 and COMT. Complex, nonlinear pharmacokinetics arise via autoinhibition of CYP2D6 and CYP2D8, resulting in zeroth order kinetics at higher doses. It is thought that this can result in sustained and higher concentrations of MDMA if the user takes consecutive doses of the drug.

MDMA and metabolites are primarily excreted as conjugates, such as sulfates and glucuronides. MDMA is a chiral compound and has been almost exclusively administered as a racemate. However, the two enantiomers have been shown to exhibit different kinetics. The disposition of MDMA may also be stereoselective, with the S-enantiomer having a shorter elimination half-life and greater excretion than the R-enantiomer. Evidence suggests that the area under the blood plasma concentration versus time curve (AUC) was two to four times higher for the (R)-enantiomer than the (S)-enantiomer after a 40 mg oral dose in human volunteers. Likewise, the plasma half-life of (R)-MDMA was significantly longer than that of the (S)-enantiomer (5.8 ± 2.2 hours vs 3.6 ± 0.9 hours). However, because MDMA excretion and metabolism have nonlinear kinetics, the half-lives would be higher at more typical doses (100 mg is sometimes considered a typical dose).

Chemistry

MDMA is in the substituted methylenedioxyphenethylamine and substituted amphetamine classes of chemicals. As a free base, MDMA is a colorless oil insoluble in water. The most common salt of MDMA is the hydrochloride salt;  pure MDMA hydrochloride is water-soluble and appears as a white or off-white powder or crystal.

Synthesis
There are numerous methods available to synthesize MDMA via different intermediates. The original MDMA synthesis described in Merck's patent involves brominating safrole to 1-(3,4-methylenedioxyphenyl)-2-bromopropane and then reacting this adduct with methylamine. Most illicit MDMA is synthesized using MDP2P (3,4-methylenedioxyphenyl-2-propanone) as a precursor. MDP2P in turn is generally synthesized from piperonal, safrole or isosafrole.  One method is to isomerize safrole to isosafrole in the presence of a strong base, and then oxidize isosafrole to MDP2P. Another method uses the Wacker process to oxidize safrole directly to the MDP2P intermediate with a palladium catalyst. Once the MDP2P intermediate has been prepared, a reductive amination leads to racemic MDMA (an equal parts mixture of (R)-MDMA and (S)-MDMA). Relatively small quantities of essential oil are required to make large amounts of MDMA. The essential oil of Ocotea cymbarum, for example, typically contains between 80 and 94% safrole. This allows 500 ml of the oil to produce between 150 and 340 grams of MDMA.

Detection in body fluids
MDMA and MDA may be quantitated in blood, plasma or urine to monitor for use, confirm a diagnosis of poisoning or assist in the forensic investigation of a traffic or other criminal violation or a sudden death. Some drug abuse screening programs rely on hair, saliva, or sweat as specimens. Most commercial amphetamine immunoassay screening tests cross-react significantly with MDMA or its major metabolites, but chromatographic techniques can easily distinguish and separately measure each of these substances. The concentrations of MDA in the blood or urine of a person who has taken only MDMA are, in general, less than 10% those of the parent drug.

History

Early research and use

MDMA was first synthesized in 1912 by Merck chemist Anton Köllisch. At the time, Merck was interested in developing substances that stopped abnormal bleeding. Merck wanted to avoid an existing patent held by Bayer for one such compound: hydrastinine. Köllisch developed a preparation of a hydrastinine analogue, methylhydrastinine, at the request of fellow lab members, Walther Beckh and Otto Wolfes. MDMA (called methylsafrylamin, safrylmethylamin or N-Methyl-a-Methylhomopiperonylamin in Merck laboratory reports) was an intermediate compound in the synthesis of methylhydrastinine. Merck was not interested in MDMA itself at the time. On 24 December 1912, Merck filed two patent applications that described the synthesis and some chemical properties of MDMA and its subsequent conversion to methylhydrastinine.

Merck records indicate its researchers returned to the compound sporadically. A 1920 Merck patent describes a chemical modification to MDMA. In 1927, Max Oberlin studied the pharmacology of MDMA while searching for substances with effects similar to adrenaline or ephedrine, the latter being structurally similar to MDMA. Compared to ephedrine, Oberlin observed that it had similar effects on vascular smooth muscle tissue, stronger effects at the uterus, and no "local effect at the eye". MDMA was also found to have effects on blood sugar levels comparable to high doses of ephedrine. Oberlin concluded that the effects of MDMA were not limited to the sympathetic nervous system. Research was stopped "particularly due to a strong price increase of safrylmethylamine", which was still used as an intermediate in methylhydrastinine synthesis. Albert van Schoor performed simple toxicological tests with the drug in 1952, most likely while researching new stimulants or circulatory medications. After pharmacological studies, research on MDMA was not continued. In 1959, Wolfgang Fruhstorfer synthesized MDMA for pharmacological testing while researching stimulants. It is unclear if Fruhstorfer investigated the effects of MDMA in humans.

Outside of Merck, other researchers began to investigate MDMA. In 1953 and 1954, the United States Army commissioned a study of toxicity and behavioral effects in animals injected with mescaline and several analogues, including MDMA. Conducted at the University of Michigan in Ann Arbor, these investigations were declassified in October 1969 and published in 1973. A 1960 Polish paper by Biniecki and Krajewski describing the synthesis of MDMA as an intermediate was the first published scientific paper on the substance.

MDMA may have been in non-medical use in the western United States in 1968. An August 1970 report at a meeting of crime laboratory chemists indicates MDMA was being used recreationally in the Chicago area by 1970. MDMA likely emerged as a substitute for its analog methylenedioxyamphetamine (MDA), a drug at the time popular among users of psychedelics which was made a Schedule 1 substance in the United States in 1970.

Shulgin's research 

American chemist and psychopharmacologist Alexander Shulgin reported he synthesized MDMA in 1965 while researching methylenedioxy compounds at Dow Chemical Company, but did not test the psychoactivity of the compound at this time. Around 1970, Shulgin sent instructions for N-methylated MDA (MDMA) synthesis to the founder of a Los Angeles chemical company who had requested them. This individual later provided these instructions to a client in the Midwest. Shulgin may have suspected he played a role in the emergence of MDMA in Chicago.

Shulgin first heard of the psychoactive effects of N-methylated MDA around 1975 from a young student who reported "amphetamine-like content". Around 30 May 1976, Shulgin again heard about the effects of N-methylated MDA, this time from a graduate student in a medicinal chemistry group he advised at San Francisco State University who directed him to the University of Michigan study. She and two close friends had consumed 100 mg of MDMA and reported positive emotional experiences. Following the self-trials of a colleague at the University of San Francisco, Shulgin synthesized MDMA and tried it himself in September and October 1976. Shulgin first reported on MDMA in a presentation at a conference in Bethesda, Maryland in December 1976. In 1978, he and David E. Nichols published a report on the drug's psychoactive effect in humans. They described MDMA as inducing "an easily controlled altered state of consciousness with emotional and sensual overtones" comparable "to marijuana, to psilocybin devoid of the hallucinatory component, or to low levels of MDA".

While not finding his own experiences with MDMA particularly powerful, Shulgin was impressed with the drug's disinhibiting effects and thought it could be useful in therapy. Believing MDMA allowed users to strip away habits and perceive the world clearly, Shulgin called the drug window. Shulgin occasionally used MDMA for relaxation, referring to it as "my low-calorie martini", and gave the drug to friends, researchers, and others who he thought could benefit from it. One such person was Leo Zeff, a psychotherapist who had been known to use psychedelic substances in his practice. When he tried the drug in 1977, Zeff was impressed with the effects of MDMA and came out of his semi-retirement to promote its use in therapy. Over the following years, Zeff traveled around the United States and occasionally to Europe, eventually training an estimated four thousand psychotherapists in the therapeutic use of MDMA. Zeff named the drug Adam, believing it put users in a state of primordial innocence.

Psychotherapists who used MDMA believed the drug eliminated the typical fear response and increased communication. Sessions were usually held in the home of the patient or the therapist. The role of the therapist was minimized in favor of patient self-discovery accompanied by MDMA induced feelings of empathy. Depression, substance use disorders, relationship problems, premenstrual syndrome, and autism were among several psychiatric disorders MDMA assisted therapy was reported to treat. According to psychiatrist George Greer, therapists who used MDMA in their practice were impressed by the results. Anecdotally, MDMA was said to greatly accelerate therapy. According to David Nutt, MDMA was widely used in the western US in couples counseling, and was called empathy. Only later was the term ecstasy used for it, coinciding with rising opposition to its use.

Rising recreational use

In the late 1970s and early 1980s, "Adam" spread through personal networks of psychotherapists, psychiatrists, users of psychedelics, and yuppies. Hoping MDMA could avoid criminalization like LSD and mescaline, psychotherapists and experimenters attempted to limit the spread of MDMA and information about it while conducting informal research. Early MDMA distributors were deterred from large scale operations by the threat of possible legislation. Between the 1970s and the mid-1980s, this network of MDMA users consumed an estimated 500,000 doses.

A small recreational market for MDMA developed by the late 1970s, consuming perhaps 10,000 doses in 1976. By the early 1980s MDMA was being used in Boston and New York City nightclubs such as Studio 54 and Paradise Garage. Into the early 1980s, as the recreational market slowly expanded, production of MDMA was dominated by a small group of therapeutically minded Boston chemists. Having commenced production in 1976, this "Boston Group" did not keep up with growing demand and shortages frequently occurred.

Perceiving a business opportunity, Michael Clegg, the Southwest distributor for the Boston Group, started his own "Texas Group" backed financially by Texas friends. In 1981, Clegg had coined "Ecstasy" as a slang term for MDMA to increase its marketability. Starting in 1983, the Texas Group mass-produced MDMA in a Texas lab or imported it from California and marketed tablets using pyramid sales structures and toll-free numbers. MDMA could be purchased via credit card and taxes were paid on sales. Under the brand name "Sassyfras", MDMA tablets were sold in brown bottles. The Texas Group advertised "Ecstasy parties" at bars and discos, describing MDMA as a "fun drug" and "good to dance to". MDMA was openly distributed in Austin and Dallas–Fort Worth area bars and nightclubs, becoming popular with yuppies, college students, and gays.

Recreational use also increased after several cocaine dealers switched to distributing MDMA following experiences with the drug.  A California laboratory that analyzed confidentially submitted drug samples first detected MDMA in 1975. Over the following years the number of MDMA samples increased, eventually exceeding the number of MDA samples in the early 1980s. By the mid-1980s, MDMA use had spread to colleges around the United States.

Media attention and scheduling

United States

In an early media report on MDMA published in 1982, a Drug Enforcement Administration (DEA) spokesman stated the agency would ban the drug if enough evidence for abuse could be found. By mid-1984, MDMA use was becoming more noticed. Bill Mandel reported on "Adam" in a 10 June San Francisco Chronicle article, but misidentified the drug as methyloxymethylenedioxyamphetamine (MMDA). In the next month, the World Health Organization identified MDMA as the only substance out of twenty phenethylamines to be seized a significant number of times.

After a year of planning and data collection, MDMA was proposed for scheduling by the DEA on 27 July 1984 with a request for comments and objections. The DEA was surprised when a number of psychiatrists, psychotherapists, and researchers objected to the proposed scheduling and requested a hearing. In a Newsweek article published the next year, a DEA pharmacologist stated that the agency had been unaware of its use among psychiatrists. An initial hearing was held on 1 February 1985 at the DEA offices in Washington, D.C. with administrative law judge Francis L. Young presiding. It was decided there to hold three more hearings that year: Los Angeles on 10 June, Kansas City, Missouri on 10–11 July, and Washington, D.C. on 8–11 October.

Sensational media attention was given to the proposed criminalization and the reaction of MDMA proponents, effectively advertising the drug. In response to the proposed scheduling, the Texas Group increased production from 1985 estimates of 30,000 tablets a month to as many as 8,000 per day, potentially making two million ecstasy tablets in the months before MDMA was made illegal. By some estimates the Texas Group distributed 500,000 tablets per month in Dallas alone. According to one participant in an ethnographic study, the Texas Group produced more MDMA in eighteen months than all other distribution networks combined across their entire histories. By May 1985, MDMA use was widespread in California, Texas, southern Florida, and the northeastern United States. According to the DEA there was evidence of use in twenty-eight states and Canada. Urged by Senator Lloyd Bentsen, the DEA announced an emergency Schedule I classification of MDMA on 31 May 1985. The agency cited increased distribution in Texas, escalating street use, and new evidence of MDA (an analog of MDMA) neurotoxicity as reasons for the emergency measure. The ban took effect one month later on 1 July 1985 in the midst of Nancy Reagan's "Just Say No" campaign.

As a result of several expert witnesses testifying that MDMA had an accepted medical usage, the administrative law judge presiding over the hearings recommended that MDMA be classified as a Schedule III substance. Despite this, DEA administrator John C. Lawn overruled and classified the drug as Schedule I. Harvard psychiatrist Lester Grinspoon then sued the DEA, claiming that the DEA had ignored the medical uses of MDMA, and the federal court sided with Grinspoon, calling Lawn's argument "strained" and "unpersuasive", and vacated MDMA's Schedule I status. Despite this, less than a month later Lawn reviewed the evidence and reclassified MDMA as Schedule I again, claiming that the expert testimony of several psychiatrists claiming over 200 cases where MDMA had been used in a therapeutic context with positive results could be dismissed because they weren't published in medical journals. In 2017, the FDA granted breakthrough therapy designation for its use with psychotherapy for PTSD. However, this designation has been questioned and problematized.

United Nations
While engaged in scheduling debates in the United States, the DEA also pushed for international scheduling. In 1985 the World Health Organization's Expert Committee on Drug Dependence recommended that MDMA be placed in Schedule I of the 1971 United Nations Convention on Psychotropic Substances. The committee made this recommendation on the basis of the pharmacological similarity of MDMA to previously scheduled drugs, reports of illicit trafficking in Canada, drug seizures in the United States, and lack of well-defined therapeutic use. While intrigued by reports of psychotherapeutic uses for the drug, the committee viewed the studies as lacking appropriate methodological design and encouraged further research. Committee chairman Paul Grof dissented, believing international control was not warranted at the time and a recommendation should await further therapeutic data. The Commission on Narcotic Drugs added MDMA to Schedule I of the convention on 11 February 1986.

Post-scheduling

The use of MDMA in Texas clubs declined rapidly after criminalization, although by 1991 the drug remained popular among young middle-class whites and in nightclubs. In 1985, MDMA use became associated with acid house on the Spanish island of Ibiza. Thereafter in the late 1980s, the drug spread alongside rave culture to the UK and then to other European and American cities. Illicit MDMA use became increasingly widespread among young adults in universities and later, in high schools. Since the mid-1990s, MDMA has become the most widely used amphetamine-type drug by college students and teenagers. MDMA became one of the four most widely used illicit drugs in the US, along with cocaine, heroin, and cannabis.
According to some estimates as of 2004, only marijuana attracts more first time users in the US.

After MDMA was criminalized, most medical use stopped, although some therapists continued to prescribe the drug illegally. Later, Charles Grob initiated an ascending-dose safety study in healthy volunteers. Subsequent FDA-approved MDMA studies in humans have taken place in the United States in Detroit (Wayne State University), Chicago (University of Chicago), San Francisco (UCSF and California Pacific Medical Center), Baltimore (NIDA–NIH Intramural Program), and South Carolina. Studies have also been conducted in Switzerland (University Hospital of Psychiatry, Zürich), the Netherlands (Maastricht University), and Spain (Universitat Autònoma de Barcelona).

"Molly", short for 'molecule', was recognized as a slang term for crystalline or powder MDMA in the 2000s.

In 2010, the BBC reported that use of MDMA had decreased in the UK in previous years. This may be due to increased seizures during use and decreased production of the precursor chemicals used to manufacture MDMA. Unwitting substitution with other drugs, such as mephedrone and methamphetamine, as well as legal alternatives to MDMA, such as BZP, MDPV, and methylone, are also thought to have contributed to its decrease in popularity.

In 2017 it was found that some pills being sold as MDMA contained pentylone, which can cause very unpleasant agitation and paranoia.

According to David Nutt, when safrole was restricted by the United Nations in order to reduce the supply of MDMA, producers in China began using anethole instead, but this gives para-methoxyamphetamine (PMA, also known as "Dr Death"), which is much more toxic than MDMA and can cause overheating, muscle spasms, seizures, unconsciousness, and death. People wanting MDMA are sometimes sold PMA instead.

Society and culture

Legal status
MDMA is legally controlled in most of the world under the UN Convention on Psychotropic Substances and other international agreements, although exceptions exist for research and limited medical use. In general, the unlicensed use, sale or manufacture of MDMA are all criminal offences.

Australia
In Australia, MDMA was declared an illegal substance in 1986 because of its harmful effects and potential for misuse. It is classed as a Schedule 9 Prohibited Substance in the country, meaning it is available for scientific research purposes only. Any other type of sale, use or manufacture is strictly prohibited by law. Permits for research uses on humans must be approved by a recognized ethics committee on human research.

In Western Australia under the Misuse of Drugs Act 1981 4.0g of MDMA is the amount required determining a court of trial, 2.0g is considered a presumption with intent to sell or supply and 28.0g is considered trafficking under Australian law.

United Kingdom
In the United Kingdom, MDMA was made illegal in 1977 by a modification order to the existing Misuse of Drugs Act 1971. Although MDMA was not named explicitly in this legislation, the order extended the definition of Class A drugs to include various ring-substituted phenethylamines. The drug is therefore illegal to sell, buy, or possess without a licence in the UK. Penalties include a maximum of seven years and/or unlimited fine for possession; life and/or unlimited fine for production or trafficking.

Some researchers such as David Nutt have criticized the current scheduling of MDMA, which he determines to be a relatively harmless drug.  An editorial he wrote in the Journal of Psychopharmacology, where he compared the risk of harm for horse riding (1 adverse event in 350) to that of ecstasy (1 in 10,000) resulted in his dismissal as well as the resignation of his colleagues from the ACMD.

United States
In the United States, MDMA is currently placed in Schedule I of the Controlled Substances Act. In a 2011 federal court hearing, the American Civil Liberties Union successfully argued that the sentencing guideline for MDMA/ecstasy is based on outdated science, leading to excessive prison sentences.  Other courts have upheld the sentencing guidelines.  The United States District Court for the Eastern District of Tennessee explained its ruling by noting that "an individual federal district court judge simply cannot marshal resources akin to those available to the Commission for tackling the manifold issues involved with determining a proper drug equivalency."

Netherlands
In the Netherlands, the Expert Committee on the List (Expertcommissie Lijstensystematiek Opiumwet) issued a report in June 2011 which discussed the evidence for harm and the legal status of MDMA, arguing in favor of maintaining it on List I.

Canada
In Canada, MDMA is listed as a Schedule 1 as it is an analogue of amphetamine. The CDSA was updated as a result of the Safe Streets and Communities Act changing amphetamines from Schedule III to Schedule I in March 2012.

Demographics

In 2014, 3.5% of 18 to 25 year-olds had used MDMA in the United States. In the European Union as of 2018, 4.1% of adults (15–64 years old) have used MDMA at least once in their life, and 0.8% had used it in the last year. Among young adults, 1.8% had used MDMA in the last year.

In Europe, an estimated 37% of regular club-goers aged 14 to 35 used MDMA in the past year according to the 2015 European Drug report. The highest one-year prevalence of MDMA use in Germany in 2012 was 1.7% among people aged 25 to 29 compared with a population average of 0.4%. Among adolescent users in the United States between 1999 and 2008, girls were more likely to use MDMA than boys.

Economics

Europe
In 2008 the European Monitoring Centre for Drugs and Drug Addiction noted that although there were some reports of tablets being sold for as little as €1, most countries in Europe then reported typical retail prices in the range of €3 to €9 per tablet, typically containing 25–65 mg of MDMA. By 2014 the EMCDDA reported that the range was more usually between €5 and €10 per tablet, typically containing 57–102 mg of MDMA, although MDMA in powder form was becoming more common.

North America
The United Nations Office on Drugs and Crime stated in its 2014 World Drug Report that US ecstasy retail prices range from US$1 to $70 per pill, or from $15,000 to $32,000 per kilogram. A new research area named Drug Intelligence aims to automatically monitor distribution networks based on image processing and machine learning techniques, in which an Ecstasy pill picture is analyzed to detect correlations among different production batches. These novel techniques allow police scientists to facilitate the monitoring of illicit distribution networks.

, most of the MDMA in the United States is produced in British Columbia, Canada and imported by Canada-based Asian transnational criminal organizations. The market for MDMA in the United States is relatively small compared to methamphetamine, cocaine, and heroin. In the United States, about 0.9 million people used ecstasy in 2010.

Australia
MDMA is particularly expensive in Australia, costing A$15–A$30 per tablet. In terms of purity data for Australian MDMA, the average is around 34%, ranging from less than 1% to about 85%. The majority of tablets contain 70–85 mg of MDMA. Most MDMA enters Australia from the Netherlands, the UK, Asia, and the US.

Corporate logos on pills

A number of ecstasy manufacturers brand their pills with a logo, often being the logo of an unrelated corporation. Some pills depict logos of products or media popular with children, such as Shaun the Sheep.

Research

In 2017, doctors in the UK began the first clinical study of MDMA in alcohol use disorder.

The potential for MDMA to be used as a rapid-acting antidepressant has been studied in clinical trials, but as of 2017 the evidence on efficacy and safety were insufficient to reach a conclusion. A 2014 review of the safety and efficacy of MDMA as a treatment for various disorders, particularly PTSD, indicated that MDMA has therapeutic efficacy in some patients; however, it emphasized that issues regarding the controlability of MDMA-induced experiences and neurochemical recovery must be addressed. The author noted that oxytocin and -cycloserine are potentially safer co-drugs in PTSD treatment, albeit with limited evidence of efficacy. This review and a second corroborating review by a different author both concluded that, because of MDMA's demonstrated potential to cause lasting harm in humans (e.g., serotonergic neurotoxicity and persistent memory impairment), "considerably more research must be performed" on its efficacy in PTSD treatment to determine if the potential treatment benefits outweigh its potential to harm to a patient.

MDMA in combination with psychotherapy has been studied as a treatment for post-traumatic stress disorder, and four clinical trials provide moderate evidence in support of this treatment. However, it is important to note that the lack of appropriate blinding of participants likely leads to overestimation of treatments effects due to high levels of response expectancy. In addition, there are no trials comparing MDMA-assisted psychotherapy for PTSD with existent evidence-based psychological treatments for PTSD, which seems to attain similar or better treatment effects compared with that achieved by MDMA-assisted psychotherapy.

In 2018 researches identified MDMA as a psychoplastogen which refers to a compound capable of promoting neuroplasticity and received the “breakthrough therapy” designation by the Food and Drug Administration for treating PTSD.

Notes

References 

MDMA - Multidisciplinary Association for Psychedelic Studies
MAPS httpsː//maps.org/mdma

A Multi-Site Phase 3 Study of MDMA-Assisted Therapy for PTSD (MAPP2) - Multidisciplinary Association for Psychedelic Studies - MAPS
https://maps.org/mdma/ptsd/mapp2/

External links 

 
 
 

5-HT1A agonists
5-HT2A agonists
5-HT2B agonists
5-HT2C agonists
Substituted amphetamines
Benzodioxoles
Entactogens and empathogens
Entheogens
Euphoriants
German inventions
Methamphetamines
Serotonin-norepinephrine-dopamine releasing agents
Serotonin receptor agonists
Stimulants
TAAR1 agonists
VMAT inhibitors
Articles containing video clips
Wikipedia medicine articles ready to translate